Gigantoscorpio willsi is an extinct species of scorpion which lived between 345.0million and 342.8million years ago, during the Visean age of the Carboniferous. Its type specimen is BMNH In. 42706a,b, In. 42707, which is a 3D body fossil of its exoskeleton found near modern-day United Kingdom.

References 

Carboniferous arthropods of Europe
Carboniferous arachnids
Prehistoric scorpions
Fossil taxa described in 1963